The Kingdom of Sweden has a long history of awarding royal commemorative insignia. The oldest is the medal awarded to the godparents of Crown Prince Gustav Adolf in 1778. The majority of these medals celebrate birthdays, jubilees, coronations, and weddings within the Royal Family of Sweden.

Royal commemorative medals are categorized in to Category C in the Swedish order of wear, meaning they are worn after the Royal Order of the Seraphim and all war decorations.

Medals

References

Orders, decorations, and medals of Sweden